Taras Vladimirovich Kulakov (born March 11, 1987), better known as CrazyRussianHacker, is a Ukrainian-American YouTuber.

He became known for his videos on "life hacks", technology and scientific demonstrations, with the catchphrase "Safety is number one priority". 

Kulakov's YouTube channel, "CrazyRussianHacker", created in 2012, has over 3 billion views and 11.6 million subscribers (as of December 2022) and is one of the platform's top 500 channels. He has a second YouTube channel, "Taras Kul", with over 3.66 million subscribers (as of December 2022). His third YouTube channel, "Kul Farm" has 361 thousand subscribers (as of December 2022).

Personal life
In 2006, Kulakov moved to Asheville, North Carolina with his family, where he worked at Walmart until 2012 while developing his early YouTube channels.

In a Q&A video, he clarified that the last place he lived before moving to the United States was the city of Donetsk in Eastern Ukraine where Russian is the majority language. As he grew up speaking Russian and not knowing much Ukrainian, he considers himself Russian.

He has two brothers and three sisters as stated in his September 2016 Q&A video. He also claims to have a half brother and a half sister as well.

References

Living people
American YouTubers
Russian YouTubers
Russian emigrants to the United States
Russian people of Ukrainian descent
American people of Ukrainian descent
American people of Russian descent
People from Asheville, North Carolina
Online edutainment
1987 births
DIY YouTubers
Educational and science YouTubers
Technology YouTubers
Ukrainian YouTubers